O Diabo is a Portuguese weekly newspaper, broadly considered right-wing. It was founded on 10 February 1976, by Maria Armanda Falcão, known by the pen name Vera Lagoa. The headquarters of the paper is in Lisbon. In 2019, the paper shifted from publishing on Tuesdays to Fridays.

O Diabo was suspended for several months by the Revolutionary Council during the Processo Revolucionário em Curso, resuming publication on February 16, 1977. For legal reasons, that date of founding appears on the newspaper's nameplate rather than the earlier one.

References

External links
 Official website
 Editorial statement

1976 establishments in Portugal
Newspapers published in Lisbon
Publications established in 1976
Portuguese-language newspapers
Weekly newspapers published in Portugal